San Fernando del Valle de Catamarca  is the capital and largest city in Catamarca Province in northwestern Argentina, on the Río Valle River, at the feet of the Cerro Ambato. The city name is normally shortened as Catamarca.

Overview 
The closest provincial capitals are La Rioja, Tucumán and Santiago del Estero.

Many pilgrims come to San Fernando del Valle de Catamarca to visit the Church of the Virgin of the Valley (1694), which contains a statue of Nuestra Señora del Valle (Our Lady of the Valley).

Catamarca is also the touristic centre of the province, with its colonial architecture, and serves as a hub to many touristic points and excursions, hiking, mountain-bike tours, horse riding, and wine tasting.

Transportation 
San Fernando del Valle is served by Coronel Felipe Varela International Airport (CTC/SANC), with flights to Buenos Aires-AEP.

History and politics
An initial settlement, called Londres, was established here by Spanish colonists in 1558; a permanent settlement was not founded until 1683, by Fernando de Mendoza y Mate de Luna. Catamarca comes from Quechua meaning "fortress on the slope".

The city, which had only 8,000 inhabitants in 1882 and was reached by a railway line in 1888, grew very slowly, and the region remained poor even in the middle of the 20th century.

Climate 
The Valle (valley) receives relatively little rainfall from summer thunderstorms; most of the precipitation is received in the form of snow on the high mountain tops surrounding the city.

Economy
Agriculture is San Fernando del Valle de Catamarca's chief economic activity; however, low rainfall makes irrigation necessary. 
Fruit and grapes are grown in the oasis areas near the city, and there is a considerable production of wine. Other local production includes preserves and handwoven ponchos.

Cotton and cattle are important economically, as well as mining at the Farallón Negro, Bajo de la Alumbrera and Capillitas mines where gold, silver, copper and tin.

Gallery

See also

Catedral Basílica de Nuestra Señora del Valle

Notes

References

External links

 Municipality of S. F. del V. de Catamarca - Official website.

Populated places in Catamarca Province
Capitals of Argentine provinces
Populated places established in 1683
Cities in Argentina
1683 establishments in the Spanish Empire